Ranichauri  is a village development committee in Sindhuli District in the Janakpur Zone of south-eastern Nepal. At the time of the 1991 Nepal census it had a population of 7,170 people living in 1,229 individual households.

There is a village by the same name of Ranichauri in the North Indian State of Uttarakhand, in Tehri Garhwal district. A neighbouring town is Chamba. This Ranichauri is known for housing the Uttarakhand University of Horticulture and Forestry.

References

External links
UN map of the municipalities of Sindhuli District

Populated places in Sindhuli District